Ringshall is the name of more than one place.

In the United Kingdom:

Ringshall, Berkhamsted, a hamlet on the border between Hertfordshire and Buckinghamshire 
Ringshall, Suffolk
Ringshall Stocks, Suffolk